Zeravschania is a genus of flowering plants belonging to the family Apiaceae.

Its native range is Caucasus to Central Asia and Pakistan.

Species:
 Zeravschania aucheri (Boiss.) Pimenov 
 Zeravschania ferulifolia (Gilli) Pimenov

References

Apioideae
Apioideae genera